RTA may refer to:

Media
 Radio and Television Arts, program at Ryerson University, Toronto, Canada
 Radio Television Afghanistan
 RTA TV, an Afghan channel
 Radiodiffusion Télévision Algérienne
 Real time attack, a game speedrun

Science and technology
 Rapid thermal anneal, in semiconductor fabrication
 Real-time analyzer of audio spectrum
 Renal tubular acidosis, a medical condition
 Restricted to Adults
 Retrospective Think Aloud
 RTA clade of araneomorph spiders
 Retrolateral tibial apophysis, defining the RTA clade
 Rewriting Techniques and Applications, an annual computer-science conference

Transit
 Railway Tie Association
 Road traffic accident

United States
 Regional Transportation Authority (Illinois), Chicago
 Regional Transportation Authority (Tennessee), Nashville
 Regional Transportation Agency of Central Maryland
 Regional Transit Authority of Southeast Michigan, Metro Detroit
 Central Puget Sound Regional Transit Authority
 New Orleans Regional Transit Authority
 South Florida Regional Transportation Authority

California
 Riverside Transit Agency, California
 San Luis Obispo Regional Transit Authority, California, US

Ohio
 Greater Cleveland Regional Transit Authority, Ohio
 Greater Dayton Regional Transit Authority, Ohio

Australia
 Former Roads & Traffic Authority, New South Wales, Australia

United Arab Emirates
 Roads and Transport Authority (Dubai)

Other uses
 Ṛta, a Hindu religious concept
 RTA (Niger), a village
 Ready-to-assemble furniture
 Regional trade agreement
 Residential Tenancies Authority, Queensland, Australia
 Rio Tinto Aluminium
 Royal Thai Army
 Race Team Alliance
 RTA (album), by Rudra